Jacob Thorbjørn Olesen (born 21 December 1989) is a Danish professional golfer who plays on the European Tour, where he has won seven times including the 2016 Turkish Airlines Open and the 2018 Italian Open. He has also won two important pairs events, representing Denmark; the 2016 World Cup of Golf with Søren Kjeldsen and the 2017 GolfSixes with Lucas Bjerregaard.

Professional career
Olesen turned professional in 2008. He finished in fourth place on the third tier Nordic League rankings in 2009, having won three tournaments, to graduate to Europe's second tier Challenge Tour for 2010. During his début season he claimed his first Challenge Tour title at The Princess, held in Sweden at the beginning of July. He finished third in the 2010 Challenge Tour ranking, earning him full exemption (category 10b) for the 2011 European Tour.

In December 2010, Olesen tied for second place at the Alfred Dunhill Championship, the first tournament of the 2011 European Tour season. This was equaled in June 2011, when Olesen tied for second at the BMW Italian Open in Turin, mostly due to a 10-under-par round of 62 on the final day, but still coming up short by one stroke of Englishman Robert Rock. The following month Olesen finished in a tie for second again at the Alstom Open de France when he bogeyed the last hole to finish one stroke behind Thomas Levet. With this finish, Olesen qualified for The 2011 Open Championship, his first major.

Olesen won the 2012 Sicilian Open. This victory placed him in the top-100 of the Official World Golf Ranking. After the final event of the 2012 season, the DP World Tour Championship, Dubai where he finished T21, Olesen moved into the world top-50 for the first time as No. 50 and played the Masters for the first time in 2013.

In the 2013 Masters Tournament, after an opening round of 78, Olesen shot rounds of 70, 68, and 68 to finish at four-under-par 284, good enough for a sixth place tie. His final three rounds of 206 combined were ten-under-par, the best in the tournament. He earned enough money to be eligible for Special Temporary Membership on the PGA Tour, which he accepted. This allowed him unlimited sponsor exemptions for the remainder of the 2013 season.

In 2015, Olesen won the Alfred Dunhill Links Championship at the Old Course at St Andrews. 

In 2016, Olesen won the Turkish Airlines Open in Turkey. This was part of the Race to Dubai Final Series.

In 2018, Olesen won the Italian Open for his fifth European Tour victory.

In September 2018, Olesen qualified for the 2018 Ryder Cup European team. Europe regained the Ryder Cup, winning by 17½ points to 10½. Olesen went 1–1 including defeating Jordan Spieth in singles (5 and 4).

After four years without winning, Olesen won the Betfred British Masters in May 2022. He finished eagle-birdie on the final two holes to claim a one shot victory over Sebastian Söderberg.

In February 2023, Olesen won the Thailand Classic for his seventh European Tour victory. He shot a final-round 66 to win by four shots ahead of Yannik Paul.

Personal life
On 29 July 2019, Olesen was arrested on suspicion of sexual assault on a British Airways flight. He was also accused of urinating in a first-class aisle. On 6 August 2019, he was formally charged with sexual assault, being drunk on an aircraft and common assault. He was suspended by the European Tour pending resolution of the criminal charges. The suspension was initially valid until the end of the legal proceedings. In July 2020, the European Tour lifted the suspension because his court date, original scheduled for 11 May 2020, was postponed until December 2021 due to the COVID-19 pandemic. On 8 December 2021, Olesen was cleared of all charges by a court in London.

Olesen supports both F.C. Copenhagen and Manchester United.

Professional wins (14)

European Tour wins (7)

1Co-sanctioned by the PGA Tour of Australasia

European Tour playoff record (0–1)

Challenge Tour wins (1)

Challenge Tour playoff record (0–1)

Nordic Golf League wins (4)

1Co-sanctioned by the Hi5 Pro Tour

Other wins (2)

Results in major championships
Results not in chronological order in 2020.

CUT = missed the half-way cut
"T" = tied for place
NT = No tournament due to the COVID-19 pandemic

Summary

Most consecutive cuts made – 4 (twice)
Longest streak of top-10s – 1 (twice)

Results in The Players Championship

CUT = missed the halfway cut
"T" indicates a tie for a place

Results in World Golf Championships
Results not in chronological order before 2015.

QF, R16, R32, R64 = Round in which player lost in match play
"T" = tied

Team appearances
Amateur
European Boys' Team Championship (representing Denmark): 2006

Professional
World Cup (representing Denmark): 2011, 2013, 2016 (winners), 2018
Seve Trophy (representing Continental Europe): 2013 (winners)
Royal Trophy (representing Europe): 2013 (winners)
EurAsia Cup (representing Europe): 2014
Ryder Cup (representing Europe): 2018 (winners)

See also
2010 Challenge Tour graduates

References

External links

Danish male golfers
European Tour golfers
PGA Tour golfers
Ryder Cup competitors for Europe
Olympic golfers of Denmark
Golfers at the 2016 Summer Olympics
People from Furesø Municipality
Sportspeople from Copenhagen
1989 births
Living people